Morag Fraser  is an Australian journalist and literary critic. Fraser edited the magazine Eureka Street from 1991 till 2003. Fraser was an adjudicator of the Miles Franklin Award from 2005 to 2011. She is currently the chairperson of the Australian Book Review.

References

Living people
Members of the Order of Australia
Australian literary critics
Australian women literary critics
Australian journalists
Australian women journalists
Date of birth missing (living people)
Year of birth missing (living people)